In the political aspects of Islam, political quietism in Islam is the religiously-motivated withdrawal from political affairs or skepticism that mere mortals can establish a true Islamic government. It is the opposite of political Islam, which holds that the Islamic religion and politics are inseparable. It has also been used to describe Muslims who believe that Muslims should support Islamic government, but that it is "forbidden to rebel against a ruler"; and Muslims who support Islamic government at the right time in the future, when a consensus of Islamic scholars or twelfth imam call for it. The Sunnis of Saudi Arabia and Salafis are sometimes described as having "quietist" and "radical" wings.

Overview
Some analysts have argued that "Islamic political culture promotes political quietism", especially when faced with forms of absolute leadership, such as autocracy, monarchy, or caliphate, and cite a "famous Islamic admonition: `Better one hundred years of the Sultan's tyranny than one year of people's tyranny over each other.`" Other sacred scriptures providing grounding for political quietism in Islam include the ayat `Obey God, obey his Prophet and obey those among you who hold authority`(Q4:59) and the hadith: `Obey him who holds authority over you, even if he be a mutilated Ethiopian slave`
Other "commonly cited" but not scriptural sayings among Sunni jurists and theologians that encourage acceptance over resistance include "whose power prevails must be obeyed" and "the world can live with tyranny but not with anarchy".

Saud al-Sarhan in his treatise Political Quietism in Islam: Sunni and Shi’i Practice and Thought states that , genre of Nasihat and advice literature started thriving. According to al-Sarhan goal of advice literature then in those times was to help preserve political authority as part of pragmatic quiet activity. al-Sarhan further states that 12th century Persian authorship while epitomizing political activism on one hand, very much gave into the divinely sanctioned absolutism of the caliphs on the other. Strategy through advice literature was a subtle expression of political activism calling for equitable and sound governance within four corners of religious diktats while continuation of pragmatic obedience to authority in power. 

Egyptian mufti Muhammad Sayyid Tantawy gave an interview in 1988 arguing among other things that the traditional Islamic duty of hisbah (forbidding wrong and commanding right) when administered by "the hand" (instead of by word or silently) in the larger society, was reserved for the authorities. According to the Western scholar Bernard Lewis, quietism is contrasted with "activist" Islam:There are in particular two political traditions, one of which might be called quietist, the other activist. The arguments in favour of both are based, as are most early Islamic arguments, on the Holy Book and on the actions and sayings of the Prophet. The quietist tradition obviously rests on the Prophet as sovereign, as judge and statesman. But before the Prophet became a head of state, he was a rebel. Before he traveled from Mecca to Medina, where he became sovereign, he was an opponent of the existing order. He led an opposition against the pagan oligarchy of Mecca and at a certain point went into exile and formed what in modern language might be called a "government in exile," with which finally he was able to return in triumph to his birthplace and establish the Islamic state in Mecca...The Prophet as rebel has provided a sort of paradigm of revolution—opposition and rejection, withdrawal and departure, exile and return. Time and time again movements of opposition in Islamic history tried to repeat this pattern.

Quietism among Salafists

Contrasting the Salafi quietists with the armed insurgencies of Islamic extremist movements and terrorist organizations who subscribe to Jihadi-Salafist doctrines, such as al-Qaeda, ISIL/ISIS/IS/Daesh, and Boko Haram, the Western journalist Graeme Wood notes that while both believe that God’s law is the only law and are "committed" to expanding the Dar al-Islam (the land of Islam), Salafi quietists share other quietist Muslims' concern about disunity in the Muslim community (Ummah). Wood quotes a Salafi preacher as saying: “The Prophet said: as long as the ruler does not enter into clear kufr [disbelief], give him general obedience,” even if he is a sinner. Classic “books of creed” all warn against causing social upheaval. Wood describes these quietists as believing "Muslims should direct their energies toward perfecting their personal life, including prayer, ritual, and hygiene," rather than jihad and conquest. He compares the "inordinate amount of time" spent on debating issues such as the proper length of trousers and whether beards may be trimmed in some areas, to ultra-Orthodox Jews who "debate whether it’s kosher to tear off squares of toilet paper on the Sabbath (does that count as 'rending cloth'?)" Sidney Jones of ICG report that (quietist) Salafism is not political activism and may be more of a barrier to the expansion of jihadist activities than a facilitator.

Western scholar Joas Wagemakers describes Salafist quietists as focusing "on the propagation of their message (da'wah) through lessons, sermons, and other missionary activities and stay away from politics and violence, which they leave to the ruler.” Another Western scholar—Quintan Wiktorowicz—uses the term purist to describe Salafists who sound similar (according to Jacob Olidort) to what Wagemakers describes as quietist: “they emphasize a focus on nonviolent methods of propagation, purification and education. They view politics as a diversion that encourages deviancy.”

Western scholar Jacob Olidort describes the Salafi scholar Muhammad Nasiruddin al-Albani (d. 1999) as "the most prominent quietist Salafist of the last century". His slogan "later in life" was: “the best policy is to stay out of politics.” Today, his students range from Madkhalis—which Olidort describes as the "absolute quietists"—to the violent Ikhwan insurgents that planned and perpetrated the siege of Mecca in 1979. Olidort argues that quietist is "an inadequate label to describe the ambitions of Albani and his followers".

Divisions among Salafists

Modern Salafi movements such as the Muslim Brotherhood, which was founded in Egypt in the 1920s, co-opted the Sufi tradition of ‘uzla' or retreat from worldly affairs and political quietism as a form of "soft jihad" against fellow Muslims. Sayyid Qutb could be said to have founded the actual movement of radical Islam. He was a prominent leader of the Muslim Brotherhood and a highly influential Islamist ideologue, and the first to articulate these anathemizing principles in his magnum opus Fī ẓilāl al-Qurʾān (In the shade of the Qurʾān) and his 1966 manifesto Maʿālim fīl-ṭarīq (Milestones), which lead to his execution by the Egyptian government. Other Salafi movements in the Middle East and North Africa and across the Muslim world adopted many of his Islamist principles. According to Qutb, the Muslim community has been extinct for several centuries and reverted to jahiliyah (the pre-Islamic age of ignorance) because those who call themselves Muslims have failed to follow the sharia law. In order to restore Islam, bring back its days of glory, and free the Muslims from the clasps of ignorance, Qutb proposed the shunning of modern society, establishing a vanguard modeled after the early Muslims, preaching, and bracing oneself for poverty or even death as preparation for jihad against what he perceived as jahili government/society, and overthrow them. Qutbism, the radical Islamist ideology derived from the ideas of Qutb, was denounced by many prominent Muslim scholars as well as other members of the Muslim Brotherhood, like Yusuf al-Qaradawi.

Quietism within Sufism

The ethics of some of Muhammad's companions, who became paradigms of what can be called an early Sunni isolationism, were later adopted by Muslim ascetical groups, who would be later known as the Sufis. However, unlike the early companions, who demarcated reclusion from un-Islamic practices such as monasticism and cleared it from any suggestion of divisiveness, there were those amongst the Sufis who regarded "ascetic seclusion alone as the means of attaining goodness". In addition, some of the companions interpreted these prophetic and Qur’anic recommendations figuratively. Al-Hakim al-Tirmidhi (750-869 CE), a Sunni jurist and one of the great early authors of Sufism, discusses a report attributed to the companion and first caliph Abū Bakr al-Ṣiddīq where the latter defines ‘uzla or retreat in the bodily sense as a synonym for monasticism. Al-Tirmidhi makes a rhetorical body shunning/heart-shunning dichotomy between Christians and Jews, who shunned the world with their bodies, and Muslims, who shunned the world with their hearts in order to conquer their egos. This resulted in a debate within the Sufi movement about what form asceticism should take, with enlightened Sufis arguing in favour of shunning the world with one’s heart, since morality is to be conceived in a social context and the true saint should be the one who participates in the social and economic life of the society. After the death of Prophet Muhammad and the assassinations of the rightly guided caliphs, Sufis deemed attempts at perfecting this world useless and thus "took the Qur’anic concept of tawakkul (reliance on God) and developed it into political quietism."

Javad Nurbakhsh stated: "In Sufi practice, quietism and seclusion – sitting in isolation, occupying oneself day and night in devotions – are condemned."  Sufis should have "active professional lives", and be in "service to the creation", i.e. be actively serving in the world giving "generously to aid others". However, in the past some Sufi masters have "retired from mainstream society in order to avoid harassment by mobs incited by hostile clerics who had branded all Sufis as unbelievers and heretics". On the other hand, Inayat Khan affirmed that "Sufism is the ancient school of wisdom, of quietism, and it has been the origin of many cults of a mystical and philosophical nature." Scholar Nikki Keddie also states that traditionally Sufis were "generally noted more for political quietism than for activism found in the sects".

Quietism in Shia islam
In Twelver Shia Islam, religious leaders who have been described as "quietist" include; 
Ayatollah Muhammad Hossein Naini, a leader during Iran's 1906 Constitutional revolution; 
Ayatollah Seyyed Hossein Borujerdi, the prominent marja from Iran from 1947 to his death in 1961; 
Ayatollah Muhsin al-Hakim, the prominent marja from Iraq from 1961 to his death in 1970; 
Ayatollah Abu al-Qasim al-Khoei, the prominent marja from Iraq from 1970 to his death in 1992;
Ayatollah Ali al-Sistani, currently one of, if not the leading Shia clerics from Iraq. 
Nearly all of Shia scholars of the Najaf hawza in Iraq are considered "quietist". 

Their stance is not a complete withdrawal from politics, since they affirm that a "true Islamic government" cannot be established until the return of the twelfth Imam. Until this time, Muslims must "search for the best form of government", advising rulers to ensure that "laws inimical to sharia" are not implemented. However, others (for example, Ali al-Sistani) advise a pluralistic, democratic system of government until the return of the Mahdi. Their "quietism" is justified by the notion that humans are prone to errors or corruption, therefore no mortal human can ever establish a just, Islamic rule on Earth. Therefore, many of them oppose the Iranian "non-quietist" concept of Guardianship of the Islamic Jurist.

See also

References

Notes

Citations

Bibliography

 
Islam-related controversies